The 1992 Prix de l'Arc de Triomphe was a horse race held at Longchamp on Sunday 4 October 1992. It was the 71st running of the Prix de l'Arc de Triomphe.

The winner was Subotica, a four-year-old colt trained in France by André Fabre. The winning jockey was Thierry Jarnet.

Race details
 Sponsor: CIGA Hotels
 Purse: 8,500,000 F; First prize: 5,000,000 F
 Going: Soft
 Distance: 2,400 metres
 Number of runners: 18
 Winner's time: 2m 39.0s

Full result

 Abbreviations: nse = nose; shd = short-head; nk = neck

Winner's details
Further details of the winner, Subotica.
 Sex: Colt
 Foaled: 13 February 1988
 Country: France
 Sire: Pampabird; Dam: Terre de Feu (Busted)
 Owner: Olivier Lecerf
 Breeder: Paul de Moussac

References

External links
 Colour Chart – Arc 1992

Prix de l'Arc de Triomphe
Prix de l'Arc de Triomphe
Prix de l'Arc de Triomphe
Prix de l'Arc de Triomphe
 1992